Bitterside, founded in 2000, is an alternative, indie, pop band composed of four members, all coming from Malta. Daniel Genius is the vocalist/bass, J.J. Galea on lead guitars, Alexei Sammut on rhythm guitars and Kenneth Vella on the drums.

Career

Bitterside released their debut album Somehow Different in 2004. They became popular in Europe and have won awards in the Mediterranean. They played the Planet venue in Vienna.

After the first album, tension ripped through the band as their future musical direction caused an epic fallout. The frontman Daniel saved the band by writing the track "Shutters," which displayed a much matured emotional side to Daniel's songwriting that inspired the band to once again pull together and concentrate on producing the music. This marked a new era for Bitterside, and the emotional drive behind Shutters became the basis of their new sound. Described as anthemic by a growing fan base, it wasn't uncommon at this stage in the band's career for them to play the song up to three times in one show to satisfy the crowd's demands which included playing major events like the P1 Power Boat Grand Prix, the XFM Music festival and the Fete de la Musique Festival.

Bitterside signed a contract with the label, Hyperphonica, in 2009. The debut UK release of single ‘Start Again’ in January 2010  displays the guitar based backbone of the band, whilst the production and arrangement gives it all the studio sheen it needs to sit comfortably in today's charts.  In the words of Daniel, ‘Start Again’ is a lament about not getting what you deserve, being close to losing the person you love, difficult situations - all part of a melancholic, sad mood. The album attempts to portray a journey in different aspects of a particular mood and ‘Start Again’ contains these bitter words that are sweetened by a sing-along melody.  If their track record is anything to go by the slick vocal melodies and instant hooks of Start Again will soon be taking the UK by storm, and this is just the beginning.

Unfortunately, by late 2010, things were not going very well in the Bitterside band. Partly, the label had failed to reach the goals it had in mind, even though the band was providing several demos. Tension within the group and label, led the band into a hiatus in December 2010.

In January 2022, the band has released a new song called "The Past ."

Discography

Albums 
 2004 - Somehow Different
 2008 - Underrated

Singles
 Left Alone
 Underrated
 Versus Life
 Start Again
 Shutters
 Drop of Wine
 Fear (the fast song)
 In Me
 So Lovely
 Fire in My Pockets
 Inside Out
 '97
 Something We Call Life
 If You
 The Past (2022)

Awards
 Bay Music Awards : Best Band Award2004, 2006

References

External links
 

Maltese musical groups
Musical groups established in 2000